Golden Acres National High School is a high school in Las Piñas, Philippines.

References

Schools in Las Piñas